Baron Killyleagh is a title in the Peerage of the United Kingdom. It was created on 23 July 1986 by Queen Elizabeth II as a substantive title for her son Prince Andrew, Duke of York, for the occasion of his marriage to Sarah Ferguson. The couple were married at Westminster Abbey.

It is named after the village and civil parish of Killyleagh, County Down, Northern Ireland. It is best known for its 12th century Killyleagh Castle. On the same day, he was also created Duke of York and Earl of Inverness.

Traditionally, the Monarch grants male members of the Royal family at least one title on their wedding day.

Baron Killyleagh (1986)

| Prince AndrewHouse of Windsor1986–presentalso: Duke of York and Earl of Inverness (1986)
| 
| 19 February 1960Buckingham Palaceson of Elizabeth II and Prince Philip, Duke of Edinburgh
| Sarah Ferguson23 July 1986 – 30 May 1996(divorce)2 children
|  now  old
|-
|}

References 

Baronies in the Peerage of the United Kingdom
Noble titles created in 1986